Coleman Patrick Welch (February 8, 1919December 4, 2000) was an American middleweight boxer. Born in Portland, Maine, Welch came from an Irish-American community and was nicked the Fighting Iceman. He made his amateur debut on May 21, 1936 at the age of 17 and fought primarily at the Portland Exposition Building during his early years. In 1941, The Ring magazine ranked him #3 among middleweights. He was a member of the U.S. Coast Guard during World War II and returned to boxing in 1943. On St. Patrick's Day (March 17), 1944, Welch fought Jake LaMotta in front of 10,000 fans at the Boston Garden. The fight ended with a unanimous decision in LaMotta's favor. His final match was on April 5, 1949. He ended his career with a 109-26-6 record over 141 matches.

He died in Las Vegas, where he had worked as a casino security guard following his retirement from boxing.

References

External links
 

1919 births
2000 deaths
American people of Irish descent
Middleweight boxers
Boxers from Maine
Sportspeople from Portland, Maine
American male boxers